Susan Lee Johnson is an American historian.

Life
In 1978 Johnson received a B.A. in history from Carthage College in Kenosha, Wisconsin, and in 1984 an M.A. at Arizona State University, and in 1993 a Ph.D. from Yale University. Johnson currently holds the Harry Reid Endowed Chair for the History of the Intermountain West at the University of Nevada, Las Vegas,  and is an emeritus professor at the University of Wisconsin in Madison, WI.

Awards
 2001 Bancroft Prize

Works
 Writing Kit Carson: Fallen Heroes in a Changing West. Chapel Hill: University of North Carolina Press, 2020.  
 
 The Lesbian Issue: Essays from Signs (Chicago: University of Chicago Press, 1985), co-edited with Estelle Freedman, Barbara Gelpi, and Kath Weston. 
 “Writing Kit Carson in the Cold War: ‘The Family,’ ‘The West,’ and Their Chroniclers,” in On the Borders of Love and Power: Families and Kinship in the Intercultural American Southwest, ed. David Wallace Adams and Crista DeLuzio (Berkeley: University of California Press, 2012), pp. 278-318.

 “Nail This to Your Door: A Disputation on the Power, Efficacy, and Indulgent Delusion of Western Scholarship that Neglects the Challenge of Gender and Women’s History,” Pacific Historical Review 79, no. 4 (Fall 2010): 605-17. 

 “The Last Fandango: Women, Work, and the End of the California Gold Rush,” in Riches for All: The California Gold Rush and the World, ed. Kenneth N. Owens (Lincoln: University of Nebraska Press, 2002), pp. 230-63.  

 
“‘A memory sweet to soldiers’: The Significance of Gender in the History of the ‘American West,’” Western Historical Quarterly 24, no. 4 (1993). Reprinted in:
Clyde Milner  ed. (1996) A New Significance: Re-envisioning the History of the American West, New York: Oxford University Press, 

 "The United States of Jessie Benton Fremont: Corresponding with the Nation", Reviews in American History, Volume 23, Number 2, June 1995

References

21st-century American historians
Living people
Carthage College alumni
Arizona State University alumni
Yale University alumni
University of Wisconsin–Madison faculty
American women historians
21st-century American women writers
Year of birth missing (living people)
Bancroft Prize winners